José Diosdado Prat García (10 August 1905 – 17 May 1994) was a Spanish politician and lawyer. He was a member of the Spanish Socialist Workers' Party. He was elected deputy from Albacete in 1933 and served as a senator from Madrid from 1 March 1979 to 17 November 1982. He also served as the 46th Solicitor General of Spain.

He died of an illness on 17 May 1994.

References

Bibliography
 

1905 births
1994 deaths
Spanish Socialist Workers' Party politicians
Knights Grand Cross of the Order of Isabella the Catholic
Members of the Congress of Deputies of the Second Spanish Republic
Members of the Senate of Spain